Sonia Maria de Souza Abrão (born June 20, 1963) is a Brazilian journalist, television presenter and writer who throughout her career has worked for networks SBT, RecordTV and RedeTV!.

Biography
Abrão was born in São Paulo on June 20, 1963, and graduated in Journalism at the Faculdade Cásper Líbero. Throughout her career she has worked for newspapers and magazines such as Notícias Populares, Contigo!, Amiga and Diário de S. Paulo. In 1991 she debuted as a journalist for SBT's Aqui Agora, retaining her position until 1997, when she was invited to join Domingo Legal as a reporter. In 2002 she was given her first solo variety show, Falando Francamente, which ended its run in 2004 after she joined RecordTV. There she hosted Sonia e Você until 2006, when a series of divergences prompted her departure. Shortly after she was invited by RedeTV! to host A Tarde É Sua, which continues to be broadcast to the present day.

Besides her career in television, Abrão has also published the cookbooks/memoirs Santas Receitas (2007) and Doces Lembranças (2013), the latter alongside her sister Margareth Abrão; the self-help books Abaixo a Mulher-Capacho! (2009) and Homens que Somem (2012); and As Pedras do Meu Caminho (2015), a biography of Polegar frontman Rafael Ilha.

Personal life
A devout Catholic Christian, Abrão was married to entrepreneur Jorge Damião for 17 years (from 1988 to 2015), with whom she had a son, Jorge Fernando Abrão Damião (born 1992); later in life she would reveal that, before getting pregnant with Jorge Fernando, she suffered a miscarriage. In 2017 she embraced veganism.

She was a cousin of Charlie Brown Jr. frontman Alexandre Magno Abrão, better known as Chorão.

References

External links

1963 births
Living people
Brazilian journalists
Brazilian women journalists
Brazilian television presenters
Brazilian women television presenters
Brazilian writers
Women food writers
Brazilian biographers
Brazilian memoirists
Self-help writers
People from São Paulo
Brazilian Roman Catholics